This article presents a map and a list of European countries by number of Internet users.

Map

List

See also

Plotted maps
European countries by electricity consumption per person
European countries by employment in agriculture (% of employed)
European countries by fossil fuel use (% of total energy)
European countries by health expense per person
European countries by military expenditure as a percentage of government expenditure
European countries by percent of population aged 0-14
European countries by percentage of urban population
European countries by percentage of women in national parliaments
List of European countries by life expectancy
List of countries by number of Internet users
List of European countries by budget revenues
List of European countries by budget revenues per capita
List of European countries by GDP (nominal) per capita
List of European countries by GDP (PPP) per capita
List of European countries by GNI (nominal) per capita 
List of European countries by GNI (PPP) per capita
List of countries by GDP (nominal) per capita
List of countries by GDP (PPP) per capita
List of countries by GDP (nominal)
List of countries by GDP (PPP)

Other
International organisations in Europe

References

Internet users
European countries by number of Internet users